In mathematics, a Lie algebroid is a vector bundle  together with a Lie bracket on its space of sections  and a vector bundle morphism , satisfying a Leibniz rule. A Lie algebroid can thus be thought of as a "many-object generalisation" of a Lie algebra.

Lie algebroids play a similar same role in the theory of Lie groupoids that Lie algebras play in the theory of Lie groups: reducing global problems to infinitesimal ones. Indeed, any Lie groupoid gives rise to a Lie algebroid, which is the vertical bundle of the source map restricted at the units. However, unlike Lie algebras, not every Lie algebroid arises from a Lie groupoid.

Lie algebroids were introduced in 1967 by Jean Pradines.

Definition and basic concepts
A Lie algebroid is a triple  consisting of

 a vector bundle  over a manifold 
 a Lie bracket  on its space of sections 
 a morphism of vector bundles , called the anchor, where  is the tangent bundle of 

such that the anchor and the bracket satisfy the following Leibniz rule:

First properties 
It follows from the definition that

 for every , the kernel  is a Lie algebra, called the isotropy Lie algebra at 
the kernel  is a (not necessarily locally trivial) bundle of Lie algebras, called the isotropy Lie algebra bundle
 the image  is a singular distribution which is integrable, i.e. its admits maximal immersed submanifolds , called the orbits, satisfying  for every .
 the anchor map  descends to a map between sections  which is a Lie algebra morphism, i.e.

for all .

The property that  induces a Lie algebra morphism was taken as an axiom in the original definition of Lie algebroid. Such redundancy, despite being known from an algebraic point of view already before Pradine's definition, was noticed only much later.

Subalgebroids and ideals 
Clearly,  admits a unique Lie algebroid structure such that  is a Lie algebra morphism. With the language introduced below, the inclusion  is a Lie algebroid morphism.

A Lie subalgebroid is called wide if . In analogy to the standard definition for Lie algebra, an ideal of a Lie algebroid is wide Lie subalgebroid  such that  is a Lie ideal. Such notion proved to be very restrictive, since  is forced to be inside the isotropy bundle . For this reason, the more flexible notion of infinitesimal ideal system has been introduced.

Morphisms 

A similar notion can be formulated for morphisms with different bases, but the compatibility with the Lie brackets becomes more involved.

Lie algebroids together with their morphisms form a category.

Examples

Trivial and extreme cases 
Given any manifold , the zero vector bundle  is a Lie algebroid with zero bracket and anchor.
Lie algebroids  over a point are the same thing as Lie algebras.
 More generally, any bundles of Lie algebras is Lie algebroid with zero anchor and Lie bracket defined pointwise.

Examples from differential geometry 
Given a principal G-bundle  over a manifold , its Atiyah algebroid is the Lie algebroid  fitting in the following short exact sequence:

The anchor is simply the assignment  and the Lie bracket is given by the commutator of differential operators.
Given a Poisson manifold , its cotangent algebroid is the cotangent vector bundle , with Lie bracket  and anchor map .
Given a closed 2-form , the vector bundle  is a Lie algebroid with anchor the projection on the first component and Lie bracketActually, the bracket above can be defined for any 2-form , but  is a Lie algebroid if and only if  is closed.

Constructions from other Lie algebroids 

Important classes of Lie algebroids

Totally intransitive Lie algebroids 
A Lie algebroid is called totally intransitive if the anchor map  is zero.

Bundle of Lie algebras (hence also Lie algebras) are totally intransitive. This actually exhaust completely the list of totally intransitive Lie algebroids: indeed, if  is totally intransitive, it must coincide with its isotropy Lie algebra bundle.

Transitive Lie algebroids 
A Lie algebroid is called transitive if the anchor map  is surjective. As a consequence:

 there is a short exact sequence
 the isotropy bundle  is locally trivial (as bundle of Lie algebras);
 the pullback of  exist for every .

The prototypical examples of transitive Lie algebroids are Atiyah algebroids. For instance:

 tangent algebroids  are trivially transitive (indeed, they are Atiyah algebroid of the principal -bundle )
 Lie algebras  are trivially transitive (indeed, they are Atiyah algebroid of the principal -bundle , for  an integration of )
 general linear algebroids  are transitive (indeed, they are Atiyah algebroids of the frame bundle )

In analogy to Atiyah algebroids, an arbitrary transitive Lie algebroid is also called abstract Atiyah sequence, and its isotropy algebra bundle  is also called adjoint bundle. However, it is important to stress that not every transitive Lie algebroid is an Atiyah algebroid. For instance:

 pullbacks of transitive algebroids are transitive
 cotangent algebroids  associated to Poisson manifolds  are transitive if and only if the Poisson structure  is non-degenerate
 Lie algebroids  defined by closed 2-forms are transitive

These examples are very relevant in the theory of integration of Lie algebroid (see below): while any Atiyah algebroid is integrable (to a gauge groupoid), not every transitive Lie algebroid is integrable.

Regular Lie algebroids 
A Lie algebroid is called regular if the anchor map  is of constant rank. As a consequence

For instance:

 any transitive Lie algebroid is regular (the anchor has maximal rank);
 any totally intransitive Lie algebroids is transitive (the anchor has zero rank);
 foliation algebroids are always regular;
 cotangent algebroids  associated to Poisson manifolds  are regular if and only if the Poisson structure  is regular.

Further related concepts

Actions 
An action of a Lie algebroid  on a manifold P along a smooth map  consists of a Lie algebra morphismsuch that, for every ,Of course, when , both the anchor  and the map  must be trivial, therefore both conditions are empty, and we recover the standard notion of action of a Lie algebra on a manifold.

Connections 
Given a Lie algebroid , an A-connection on a vector bundle  consists of an -bilinear mapwhich is -linear in the first factor and satisfies the following Leibniz rule:for every , where  denotes the Lie derivative with respect to the vector field .

The curvature of an A-connection  is the -bilinear mapand  is called flat if .

Of course, when , we recover the standard notion of connection on a vector bundle, as well as those of curvature and flatness.

Representations 
A representation of a Lie algebroid  is a vector bundle  together with a flat A-connection . Equivalently, a representation  is a Lie algebroid morphism .

The set  of isomorphism classes of representations of a Lie algebroid  has a natural structure of semiring, with direct sums and tensor products of vector bundles.

Examples include the following:

 When , an -connection simplifies to a linear map  and the flatness condition makes it into a Lie algebra morphism, therefore we recover the standard notion of representation of a Lie algebra.
 Representations of the tangent algebroid  are vector bundles endowed with flat connections

Note that there an arbitrary Lie groupoid does not have a canonical representation on its Lie algebroid, playing the role of the adjoint representation of Lie groups on their Lie algebras. However, this becomes possible if one allows the more general notion of representation up to homotopy.

Lie algebroid cohomology 
Consider a Lie algebroid  and a representation .

This general definition recovers well-known cohomology theories:

 The cohomology of a foliation Lie algebroid  coincides with the leafwise cohomology of the foliation .

Lie groupoid-Lie algebroid correspondence 
The standard construction which associates a Lie algebra to a Lie group generalises to this setting: to every Lie groupoid  one can canonically associate a Lie algebroid  defined as follows:

 the anchor map is the differential  of the target map .

Of course, a symmetric construction arises when swapping the role of the source and the target maps, and replacing right- with left-invariant vector fields; an isomorphism between the two resulting Lie algebroids will be given by the differential of the inverse map .

Lie functor 
The mapping  sending a Lie groupoid to a Lie algebroid is actually part of a categorical construction. Indeed, any Lie groupoid morphism  can be differentiated to a morphism  between the associated Lie algebroids.

This construction defines a functor from the category of Lie groupoids and their morphisms to the category of Lie algebroids and their morphisms, called the Lie functor.

Structures and properties induced from groupoids to algebroids 
Let  be a Lie groupoid and  its associated Lie algebroid. Then

 The isotropy algebras  are the Lie algebras of the isotropy groups 
 The orbits of  coincides with the orbits of 

Examples 
 The Lie algebroid of a Lie group  is the Lie algebra 
 The Lie algebroid of both the pair groupoid  and the fundamental groupoid  is the tangent algebroid  
 The Lie algebroid of the unit groupoid  is the zero algebroid 
 The Lie algebroid of a Lie group bundle  is the Lie algebra bundle 
 The Lie algebroid of an action groupoid  is the action algebroid 
 The Lie algebroid of a gauge groupoid  is the Atiyah algebroid 
 The Lie algebroid of a general linear groupoid  is the general linear algebroid 
 The Lie algebroid of both the holonomy groupoid  and the monodromy groupoid  is the foliation algebroid 
 The Lie algebroid of a tangent groupoid  is the tangent algebroid , for 
 The Lie algebroid of a jet groupoid  is the jet algebroid , for

Detailed example 1 
Let us describe the Lie algebroid associated to the pair groupoid . Using the unit map , one obtain the vector bundle .

Detailed example 2 
Consider the (action) Lie groupoid

Since its anchor map  is given by the differential of the target map, there are two cases for the isotropy Lie algebras, corresponding to the fibers of :

Integration of a Lie algebroid

Lie theorems 

On the other hand, there is no analogue of the classical Lie III theorem, i.e. going back from any Lie algebroid to a Lie groupoid is not always possible. Pradines claimed that such a statement hold, and the first explicit example of non-integrable Lie algebroids, coming for instance from foliation theory, appeared only several years later. Despite several partial results, including a complete solution in the transitive case, the general obstructions for an arbitrary Lie algebroid to be integrable have been discovered only in 2003 by Crainic and Fernandes. Adopting a more general approach, one can see that every Lie algebroid integrates to a stacky Lie groupoid.

Weinstein groupoid 
Given any Lie algebroid , the natural candidate for an integration is given by the Weinstein groupoid , where  denotes the space of -paths and  the relation of -homotopy between them. Indeed, one can show that  is an -simply connected topological groupoid, with the multiplication induced by the concatenation of paths. Moreover, if  is integrable,  admits a smooth structure such that it coincides with the unique -simply connected Lie groupoid integrating .

This approach led to the introduction of objects called monodromy groups, associated to any Lie algebroid, and to the following fundamental result: A Lie algebroid is integrable if and only if its monodromy groups are uniformly discrete.Such statement simplifies in the transitive case:A transitive Lie algebroid is integrable if and only if its monodromy groups are discrete.The results above show also that every Lie algebroid admits an integration to a local Lie groupoid (roughly speaking, a Lie groupoid where the multiplication is defined only in a neighbourhood around the identity elements).

Integrable examples 

 Lie algebras are always integrable (by Lie III theorem)
 Atiyah algebroids of a principal bundle are always integrable (to the gauge groupoid of that principal bundle)
 Lie algebroids with injective anchor (hence foliation algebroids) are alway integrable (by Frobenius theorem)
 Lie algebra bundle are always integrable
 Action Lie algebroids are always integrable (but the integration is not necessarily an action Lie groupoid)
 Any Lie subalgebroid of an integrable Lie algebroid is integrable.

A non-integrable example 

Since  is transitive, it is integrable if and only if it is the Atyah algebroid of some principal bundle; a careful analysis shows that this happens if and only if the subgroup  is a lattice, i.e. it is discrete.

See also
R-algebroid
Lie bialgebroid

References

Books and lecture notes

 Alan Weinstein, Groupoids: unifying internal and external symmetry, AMS Notices, 43 (1996), 744-752. Also available at arXiv:math/9602220.
 Kirill Mackenzie, Lie Groupoids and Lie Algebroids in Differential Geometry, Cambridge U. Press, 1987.
 Kirill Mackenzie, General Theory of Lie Groupoids and Lie Algebroids, Cambridge U. Press, 2005.
 Marius Crainic, Rui Loja Fernandes, Lectures on Integrability of Lie Brackets, Geometry&Topology Monographs 17 (2011) 1–107, available at arXiv:math/0611259.
 Eckhard Meinrenken, Lecture notes on Lie groupoids and Lie algebroids, available at http://www.math.toronto.edu/mein/teaching/MAT1341_LieGroupoids/Groupoids.pdf.
 Ieke Moerdijk, Janez Mrčun, Introduction to Foliations and Lie Groupoids, Cambridge U. Press, 2010.

Lie algebras
Differential geometry
Differential topology
Differential operators
Generalizations of the derivative
Geometry processing
Vector bundles